SEACOR Holdings, based in Fort Lauderdale, provides equipment and services to the offshore petroleum industry and the marine transportation industry.

History
SEACOR was founded in 1989 by Charles Fabrikant.

In December 1989, the company acquired the marine unit of Nicor Gas.

In 1992, the company became a public company via an initial public offering.

In 2004, the company acquired Era Aviation following its acquisition of Tex-Air Helicopters in 2002.

Also in 2004, the company acquired Seabulk.

In March 2012, the company sold National Response Corporation  and its affiliated businesses to J.F. Lehman & Company.

In January 2013, the company sold its energy trading division to Par Pacific Holdings.

In 2017, the company acquired International Shipholding Corporation, including Waterman Steamship Corporation.

In 2018, the company acquired full ownership of CLEANCOR Energy Solutions LLC.

In April 2021, American Industrial Partners, a private equity firm, acquired the company.

See also 
 CG Railway

References

External links

1989 establishments in Florida
1992 initial public offerings
Companies formerly listed on the New York Stock Exchange
Companies based in Fort Lauderdale, Florida
Transportation companies of the United States
Oilfield services companies
Transportation companies based in Florida